Lunch Date is a Philippine television variety show broadcast by GMA Network. Originally hosted by Orly Mercado, Rico J. Puno, Chiqui Hollman and Toni Rose Gayda, it premiered on June 9, 1986 replacing Student Canteen. The show concluded on March 19, 1993. It was replaced by SST: Salo-Salo Together in its timeslot.

Overview
Lunch Date started airing on June 9, 1986 replacing Student Canteen, with Orly Mercado, Rico J. Puno, Toni Rose Gayda and Chiqui Hollmann serving as the hosts. The show originally aired from Studio A of the old GMA building in EDSA, but moved to the GMA Broadway Centrum in 1987, the first of GMA's programs to do so.

When the show was reformatted after a year, it retained both Gayda and Hollman and added Randy Santiago, Keno, Lito Pimentel, Tina Revilla, Louie Heredia, Jon Santos, Dennis Padilla, Manilyn Reynes, Willie Revillame and Ai-Ai delas Alas to the show.

Cast

Orly Mercado 
Rico J. Puno 
Chiqui Hollmann 
Toni Rose Gayda 
Randy Santiago 
Keno 
Willie Revillame 
Lito Pimentel 
Tina Revilla 
Louie Heredia 
Manilyn Reynes 
Jon Santos 
Dennis Padilla 
Ai-Ai delas Alas 
Jenine Desiderio 
Rustom Padilla (now known as BB Gandanghari) 
Isabel Granada 
Gino Padilla 
Samantha Chavez 
Ogie Alcasid 
Geneva Cruz 
Vernie Varga
Mahal 
 Bayani Agbayani

Guest hosts
 German Moreno
 Ike Lozada

Accolades

References

External links
 

1986 Philippine television series debuts
1993 Philippine television series endings
Filipino-language television shows
GMA Network original programming
Philippine variety television shows